Toba Tek Singh is a city in Punjab Province of Pakistan.

Toba Tek Singh may also refer to:

 Toba Tek Singh District, district of which Toba Tek Singh is the administrative capital
 Toba Tek Singh Tehsil, subdistrict or tehsil which is part of Toba Tek Singh District
 "Toba Tek Singh" (short story), story published in 1955
 Toba Tek Singh (film), 2018 film adaptation
 Boota from Toba Tek Singh, Pakistani Television series